Jim Hart is a Canadian politician and retired public servant who is the current chair of the Toronto Police Services Board since October 22, 2019. Hart served as a Toronto city councillor from 2017 to 2018, representing Ward 44 Scarborough East, and was a former general manager of Toronto Parks, Forestry & Recreation.

Career

City of Toronto 
Hart is a former general manager of the Toronto Parks, Forestry and Recreation Division and served in Councillor Ron Moeser's office as an assistant. He retired in 2014 after working in the Toronto government for 31 years.

Politics 
Hart was appointed to the Toronto City Council in a 27 to 44 vote, beating former mayoral candidate David Soknacki following the death in office of Ron Moeser. He was endorsed via a letter to council by Moeser's widow, Heather. 

Hart stated during his speech to council that if appointed, he will not seek re-election in the 2018 Toronto election.

Toronto Police Services Board 
As councillor, Hart served as vice-chair of the Toronto Police Services Board.

As of September 30, 2019, Hart was appointed to the Toronto Police Services Board for a three-year term. On October 22, 2019, he was elected interim chair.

References

External links
Councillor Jim Hart
Appointment to fill the vacancy in the Office of Councillor, Ward 44, Scarborough - East

Year of birth missing (living people)
Living people
People from Scarborough, Toronto
Canadian civil servants
Toronto city councillors
Toronto Police Service